At Fillmore East is the first live album by American rock band the Allman Brothers Band, and their third release overall. Produced by Tom Dowd, the album was released on July 6, 1971, in the United States by Capricorn Records. As the title indicates, the recording took place at the New York City music venue Fillmore East, which was run by concert promoter Bill Graham. It was recorded over the course of three nights in March 1971 and features the band performing extended jam versions of songs such as "Whipping Post", "You Don't Love Me" and "In Memory of Elizabeth Reed". When first commercially released, it was issued as a double LP with just seven songs across four vinyl sides.

At Fillmore East was the band's artistic and commercial breakthrough, rapidly escalating the band's exposure and gaining them a new legion of loyal fans. Many people consider At Fillmore East to be one of the best live albums of all time, and consider the album to be the start of the band's association with the jam band school of music (although members of the band have repudiated the label, stating instead they are just "a band that jams") . It has also been ranked among the best overall albums by artists and continues to be a top seller in the band's catalog, becoming their first album to go platinum. In 2004, the album was selected for preservation in the Library of Congress, deemed to be "culturally, historically, or aesthetically important" by the National Recording Registry.

Background
Shortly after completing recording of their second album, Idlewild South (1970), band leader Duane Allman was contacted by guitarist Eric Clapton to contribute to his new project, Derek and the Dominos. Allman was a huge fan of his work with the band Cream, and likewise Clapton enjoyed Allman's session work on Wilson Pickett's "Hey Jude" some years prior. They met after a show one night in Miami and had a jam session together until the next afternoon, with the two guitarists regarding one another as "instant soulmates". Clapton invited Duane to join Derek and the Dominos, and according to band biographer Alan Paul he considered it; in the end, he declined and rejoined the Allman Brothers Band, returning after missing a string of several shows. The sessions were collected on the album Layla and Other Assorted Love Songs, issued that November.

In the interim, Idlewild South had yet to achieve strong commercial success, but the band's popularity and reputation began to increase due to their live performances. The band played continuously in 1970, performing over 300 dates on the road traveling in a Ford Econoline van and later, a Winnebago, nicknamed the Wind Bag. During this time, the group began struggling with drug addictions. Everyone in the group, with the exception of the brothers, was also struggling to make a living (vocalist Gregg Allman received more money from royalty payments and Duane more from session work). In one incident, tour manager Twiggs Lyndon stabbed and killed a promoter for not paying the band; he later claimed temporary insanity. Their fortunes began to change over the course of 1971, where the band's average earnings doubled.

The Allman Brothers Band had first played Fillmore East in December 1969, opening for Blood, Sweat & Tears for three nights. Promoter Bill Graham enjoyed the band and promised to have them back soon. In January 1970, the band opened for Buddy Guy and B.B. King at San Francisco's Fillmore West, and one month later at Fillmore East supporting the Grateful Dead. According to biographer Alan Paul, "these shows were crucial in establishing the band and exposing them to a wider, sympathetic audience on both coasts." Drummer Butch Trucks considered their performances at the Fillmore East to be the launching pad for their success. In 1970, Duane Allman told disc jockey Ed Shane, "You know, we get kind of frustrated doing the [studio] records, and I think, consequently, our next album will be ... a live recording, to get some of that natural fire on it." "We were not intentionally trying to buck the system, but keeping each song down to 3:14 just didn't work for us," remembered Gregg Allman. "And we realized that the audience was a big part of what we did, which couldn't be duplicated in a studio. A lightbulb finally went off; we needed to make a live album."

Recording and production

At Fillmore East was recorded over two nights — March 12 and 13, 1971 — for which the band was paid $1,250 each show. The shows were typical performances for the band, and regarded as slightly above average by drummer Jai Johanny Johanson. Ads for the shows read: "Bill Graham Presents in New York — Johnny Winter And, Elvin Bishop Group, Extra Added Attraction: Allman Brothers." While Winter was billed as headliner, by the third night the Allman Brothers were closing the show.

Tom Dowd produced At Fillmore East; he had previously worked on their second studio album, Idlewild South. He had recently returned from Africa from working on the film Soul to Soul, and stayed in New York several days to oversee the live recording. "It was a good truck, with a 16-track machine and a great, tough-as-nails staff who took care of business," recalled Dowd. He gave the staff suggestions and noted the band had two lead guitarists and two drummers, "which was unusual, and it took some foresight to properly capture the dynamics." Things went smoothly until the band unexpectedly brought out saxophonist Rudolph "Juicy" Carter, an unknown horn player, and longstanding "unofficial" band member Thom Doucette on harmonica. "I was just hoping we could isolate them, so we could wipe them and use the songs, but they started playing and the horns were leaking all over everything, rendering the songs unusable," said Dowd. He rushed to Duane during the break to tell him to cut the horn players; while Duane loved the players, he put up no fight with Dowd. The final show was delayed because of a bomb scare, and did not end until 6 am.

Each night following the shows, the musicians and Dowd would "grab some beers and sandwiches" and head to Manhattan's Atlantic Studios to go over the performances. Set lists for following shows were crafted by listening to the recordings and going over what they could keep and what they would need to capture once more. "We wanted to give ourselves plenty of times to do it because we didn't want to go back and overdub anything, because then it wouldn't have been a real live album," said Gregg Allman, and in the end, the band only edited out Doucette's harmonica when it didn't fit. "That was our pinnacle," said Dickey Betts later. "The Fillmore days are definitely the most cherished memories that I have. If you asked everybody in the band, they would probably say that."

On June 27, the Fillmore East closed, and the band were invited to play a final, invitation-only concert, along with Edgar Winter, the Beach Boys and Country Joe McDonald. The Beach Boys initially refused to perform unless they headlined the event, but Graham refused, telling them that the Allman Brothers would be closing the show, and they were free to leave if they disagreed. This Allman Brothers' performance was used for the second disc of the 2006 expanded version of the follow-up album to At Fillmore East, Eat a Peach.

Composition
At Fillmore East showcases the band's eclectic mixture of blues, rock, country, and jazz. "Fusion is a term that came later, but if you wanted to look at a fusion album, it would be Fillmore East. Here was a rock 'n' roll band playing blues in the jazz vernacular. And they tore the place up," said Dowd. Stage Manager Michael Ahern opens At Fillmore East with a simple introduction: "Okay, the Allman Brothers Band." Duane Allman biographer Randy Poe describes it as "the only low-key moment over the course of the [show]." The cover of Blind Willie McTell's "Statesboro Blues" which opens the set showcases Duane Allman's slide guitar work in open E tuning. "Statesboro Blues" bears close resemblance to Taj Mahal's 1968 rendition, which had inspired Duane to pick up slide guitar playing. "Done Somebody Wrong" follows, and is introduced by Duane as "an old Elmore James song ... This is an old true story ..." Thom Doucette takes a solo on blues harp, and by the end of the song, the band breaks out of the shuffle and "builds up to a dual-lead guitar, triplet-based crescendo."
"Stormy Monday" echoes the band's blues roots, and many guitar parts come from the version cut by Bobby "Blue" Bland in the early 1960s. Allman and Betts trade solos, as does Gregg Allman on the organ as the tempo shifts into a "swinging" beat. "You Don't Love Me" kicks off the first of the jazz-inspired jams and features a solo from Duane Allman in which the entire group stops, leaving it just him and his guitar. The song's conclusion quotes the Christian hymn "Joy to the World". "Hot 'Lanta" is an instrumental, which has elements in common with jazz rock and progressive rock, and is a showcase for Berry Oakley's bass-playing. "In Memory of Elizabeth Reed", with its harmonized melody, Latin feel, and burning drive invited comparisons with jazz saxophonist John Coltrane (especially Duane's solo-ending pull-offs, a direct nod to the musician). The performance begins with a "long, laconic intro" by Betts employing volume swells, reminiscent of the "dreamy trumpet" used to open songs on Miles Davis' Kind of Blue (1959).
"Whipping Post" (opening in 11/8 time, unusual territory for a rock band) by this point had become one of the longest jams in the band's set; the original album version runs five minutes, while the At Fillmore East version exceeds 23. Aside from the opening bassline and lyrics, the two versions are completely unalike. Again, Betts and Allman trade long guitar solos, with one of Betts' solos quoting what would later become the main theme for the song "Les Brers in A Minor", as featured on the band's 1972 album Eat a Peach.  The song includes a false ending which quotes the theme of the French nursery rhyme song "Frère Jacques", and finally closes with "long, sustained notes" from Allman opposite Trucks' kettledrum. Applause concludes the album and the song fades out. During the fadeout, Trucks begins playing the tympani intro to "Mountain Jam" which would not be released in its entirety until its inclusion on Eat a Peach.

Artwork
The band devised the cover idea for At Fillmore East rather than leaving it in the hands of Atlantic executives (Duane Allman was particularly disgusted with the artwork for Sam & Dave's Hold On, I'm Comin', although that album's artwork was created by Stax Records, which Atlantic had previously distributed). Initially, the album cover was to be shots of the band taken in front of the Fillmore East with their names on the marquee above them, but no one was satisfied with the results. The band's main purpose for the cover was that it be as "meat and potatoes" as the band's ethos and performing, and someone suggested the band make it a photograph of the band in an alley waiting with their gear to go onstage.
The image was shot by photographer Jim Marshall one morning in the band's home of Macon, Georgia. The group were not very happy about being woken up early to shoot ("we figured it didn't make a damn bit of difference what the cover was or what time we took it," said guitarist Dickey Betts). Normally the band hated being photographed; the cover of later retrospective release The Fillmore Concerts shows them displaying terminal boredom. However, during the session, Duane spotted a dealer friend, raced over and grabbed a bag of contraband, then returned to his seat, discreetly clutching the stash in his lap. This made the whole band laugh, resulting in a memorable image. Marshall stenciled the album title on one of the road cases, which were stacked in front of the wall.
The back cover shows their road crew gathered in the same spot with 16 oz cans of Pabst Blue Ribbon beer provided by the photographer as a reward to the roadies for lugging out and stacking the band's heavy equipment for the shoot. Among the crew on the back cover are Joseph "Red Dog" Campbell, Kim Payne, Mike Callahan, Joe Dan Petty and Willie Perkins (the last two the newest additions to the crew at the time). The idea to have the crew on the back cover was Duane Allman's idea, as all involved viewed them the "unsung heroes" in the operation. A photo of Lyndon, then in jail awaiting his trial, was superimposed to the wall behind the crew.

Release and critical reception

At Fillmore East was released in July 1971 by Capricorn Records as a double album, but reduced to the cost of a single LP. Atlantic and Atco initially rejected the idea of issuing a double album, with Jerry Wexler feeling it "ridiculous to preserve all these jams." Manager Phil Walden explained to executives that the band were less of a studio band and that live performances were most important to them. In all, the album featured seven songs spread over four vinyl sides. The album received strong initial sales. While previous albums by the band had taken months to hit the charts (often near the bottom of the top 200), the record started to climb the charts after a matter of days. At Fillmore East peaked at number thirteen on Billboard Top Pop Albums chart, and was certified gold by the Recording Industry Association of America that October. The album was later certified platinum on August 25, 1992.

In a contemporary review, George Kimball of Rolling Stone magazine said that "The Allman Brothers had many fine moments at the Fillmores, and this live double album (recorded March 12th and 13th of this year) must surely epitomize all of them." Kimball cited the band as "the best damn rock and roll band this country has produced in the past five years" and said of comparisons to the Grateful Dead at the time, "The range of their material and the more tenuous fact that they also use two drummers have led to what I suppose are inevitable comparisons to the Dead in its better days." In a less enthusiastic review for The Village Voice, Robert Christgau gave At Fillmore East a "B−" grade and said the songs "sure do boogie", but ultimately found it musically aimless: "even if Duane Allman plus Dickey Betts does equal Jerry Garcia, the Dead know roads are for getting somewhere. That is, Garcia (not to bring in John Coltrane) always takes you someplace unexpected on a long solo. I guess the appeal here is the inevitability of it all."

In a retrospective review, AllMusic editor Stephen Thomas Erlewine gave the album five out of five stars and stated, "[it] remains the pinnacle of the Allmans and Southern rock at its most elastic, bluesy, and jazzy". Mark Kemp of Rolling Stone gave it five stars in a 2002 review and commented that "these shows [...] remain the finest live rock performance ever committed to vinyl", and the album "captures America's best blues-rock band at its peak".

At Fillmore East was one of 50 recordings chosen in 2004 by the Library of Congress to be added to the National Recording Registry. Rolling Stone included it at number 49 in their 2003 list of The 500 Greatest Albums of All Time, describing it as "rock's greatest live double LP", maintaining the rating in a 2012 revision, and slipping to number 105 in the 2020 reboot of the list. The album was also included in the books 1001 Albums You Must Hear Before You Die (2005) and 1,000 Recordings to Hear Before You Die (2008). In the latter, author Tom Moon noted that, nearly forty years after its release, "[the album] remains one of the best live albums in rock history. Ornery and loud, it's perfect driving music for the road that goes on forever."

In 2020 The Independent newspaper rated it the best live album of all time.

Track listing

Recording dates:
March 12 late show: "Done Somebody Wrong", second part of "You Don't Love Me"
March 13 early show: "Statesboro Blues", "In Memory of Elizabeth Reed", first part of "You Don't Love Me"
March 13 late show: "Stormy Monday", "Hot 'Lanta", "Whipping Post"

Expanded editions
Over the years several expanded editions of At Fillmore East have been released.

The Fillmore Concerts
On October 10, 1992, The Fillmore Concerts, an expanded version of At Fillmore East, was released as a two-disc CD.  It includes all the songs from the original album, plus the live songs from Eat a Peach – "One Way Out", "Trouble No More", and "Mountain Jam" – and two additional tracks – "Don't Keep Me Wonderin'" and "Drunken Hearted Boy" – all of which were recorded at the same concerts.  The album was remixed from the concert recordings, and a few of the songs are alternate takes, so the same songs sound somewhat different from those on the original album.

At Fillmore East Deluxe Edition
The Deluxe Edition was released as a two-disc CD on September 23, 2003.  It contains the same songs, in a slightly different order, as The Fillmore Concerts, and one additional track from the same concerts, "Midnight Rider".  The Deluxe Edition is based on the master recordings for At Fillmore East and Eat a Peach, and so it sounds more similar to those albums than The Fillmore Concerts does.

The 1971 Fillmore East Recordings
The 1971 Fillmore East Recordings was released on July 29, 2014.  This six-CD boxed set contains the four complete concerts—the early and late shows from March 12 and March 13, 1971—from which the songs included on At Fillmore East were selected, plus the Allman Brothers' performance at the Fillmore East closing show on June 27, 1971.  A three Blu-ray edition was also released which contains a multi-channel mix.

* = Previously unreleased track

# = Track selected for the original "At Fillmore East" Album

Other Fillmore East recordings
 Eat a Peach – contains "Trouble No More" from March 13, 1971 (Show 1) and "Mountain Jam" from March 13, 1971 (Show 2) and "One Way Out" from June 27, 1971
 Duane Allman: An Anthology contains "Don't Keep Me Wonderin'" from March 13, 1971 (Show 1)
 Duane Allman Anthology, Vol. 2 contains "Midnight Rider" from June 27, 1971
 Dreams contains "Drunken Hearted Boy" from March 13, 1971 (Show 2)
 Eat a Peach, Deluxe Edition – second CD (the final Fillmore East concert) also contains "Statesboro Blues", "Don't Keep Me Wonderin'", "Done Somebody Wrong", "One Way Out", "In Memory of Elizabeth Reed", "Midnight Rider", "Hot 'Lanta", "Whipping Post", and "You Don't Love Me" from June 27, 1971
 The Road Goes On Forever contains "Statesboro Blues" from March 12, 1971 (Disc 1).

Personnel
The Allman Brothers Band
Duane Allman – lead guitar, slide guitar
Gregg Allman – organ, piano, vocals
Dickey Betts – lead guitar
Berry Oakley – bass guitar
Jai Johanny Johanson – drums, congas, timbales
Butch Trucks – drums, timpani
Guest musicians
Thom Doucette – harmonica on "Don't Keep Me Wonderin'", "Done Somebody Wrong", "One Way Out", "Stormy Monday" and "You Don't Love Me"
 Jim Santi – tambourine
Guest musicians (The Fillmore Concerts and The 1971 Fillmore East Recordings)
Bobby Caldwell – percussion on "Drunken Hearted Boy" and on March 12 shows starting with "In Memory of Elizabeth Reed"
Rudolph ("Juici") Carter – soprano saxophone on (only) both March 12 shows, starting with "In Memory of Elizabeth Reed" 
Elvin Bishop – vocals on "Drunken Hearted Boy"
Steve Miller – piano on "Drunken Hearted Boy"
Production (At Fillmore East)
Tom Dowd – producer, liner notes
Bruce Malamut – assistant producer
Aaron Baron – engineer
Sam Whiteside – engineer
Larry Dahlstrom – assistant Engineer
Dennis M. Drake – mastering
Jim Marshall – photography
Production (The Fillmore Concerts)
Tom Dowd – producer
Jay Mark – mixer
Dan Kincaid – digital mastering
Bill Levenson – executive producer
Kirk West – associate producer
Terri Tierney – project coordination
Richard Bauer – art direction
Jim Marshall – graphic concept
Jimmy Guterman – liner notes
John Perkins – Best Boy

Notes

References

External links
 
 BBC Review

1971 live albums
Capricorn Records live albums
The Allman Brothers Band live albums
United States National Recording Registry recordings
Live at the Fillmore East albums
Grammy Hall of Fame Award recipients
Albums produced by Tom Dowd
United States National Recording Registry albums

pt:The Allman Brothers Band#Discografia